Tegula eiseni, common name the western banded tegula, is a species of sea snail, a marine gastropod mollusk in the family Tegulidae.

Description
The size of the shell varies between 13 mm and 22 mm.

Distribution
This species occurs in the Pacific Ocean from central California, USA to Baja California, Mexico

References

 Williams S.T., Karube S. & Ozawa T. (2008) Molecular systematics of Vetigastropoda: Trochidae, Turbinidae and Trochoidea redefined. Zoologica Scripta 37: 483–506.

External links
 
 Wallawalla: Tegula eiseni

eiseni
Gastropods described in 1936